Wayne Township may refer to:

Illinois
 Wayne Township, DuPage County, Illinois

Indiana
 Wayne Township, Allen County, Indiana
 Wayne Township, Bartholomew County, Indiana
 Wayne Township, Fulton County, Indiana
 Wayne Township, Hamilton County, Indiana
 Wayne Township, Henry County, Indiana
 Wayne Township, Huntington County, Indiana
 Wayne Township, Jay County, Indiana
 Wayne Township, Kosciusko County, Indiana
 Wayne Township, Marion County, Indiana
 Metropolitan School District of Wayne Township
 Wayne Township, Montgomery County, Indiana
 Wayne Township, Noble County, Indiana
 Wayne Township, Owen County, Indiana	
 Wayne Township, Randolph County, Indiana
 Wayne Township, Starke County, Indiana
 Wayne Township, Tippecanoe County, Indiana
 Wayne Township, Wayne County, Indiana

Iowa
 Wayne Township, Henry County, Iowa
 Wayne Township, Jones County, Iowa
 Wayne Township, Mitchell County, Iowa
 Wayne Township, Monroe County, Iowa

Kansas
 Wayne Township, Doniphan County, Kansas
 Wayne Township, Edwards County, Kansas

Michigan
 Wayne Township, Cass County, Michigan

Missouri
 Wayne Township, Bollinger County, Missouri
 Wayne Township, Buchanan County, Missouri

Nebraska
 Wayne Township, Custer County, Nebraska

New Jersey
 Wayne Township, Passaic County, New Jersey

North Dakota
 Wayne Township, Bottineau County, North Dakota

Ohio
 Wayne Township, Adams County, Ohio
 Wayne Township, Ashtabula County, Ohio
 Wayne Township, Auglaize County, Ohio
 Wayne Township, Belmont County, Ohio
 Wayne Township, Butler County, Ohio
 Wayne Township, Champaign County, Ohio
 Wayne Township, Clermont County, Ohio
 Wayne Township, Clinton County, Ohio
 Wayne Township, Columbiana County, Ohio
 Wayne Township, Darke County, Ohio
 Wayne Township, Fayette County, Ohio
 Wayne Township, Jefferson County, Ohio
 Wayne Township, Knox County, Ohio
 Wayne Township, Mercer County, Ohio
 Wayne Township, Monroe County, Ohio
 Wayne Township, Montgomery County, Ohio, defunct
 Wayne Township, Muskingum County, Ohio
 Wayne Township, Noble County, Ohio
 Wayne Township, Pickaway County, Ohio
 Wayne Township, Tuscarawas County, Ohio
 Wayne Township, Warren County, Ohio
 Wayne Township, Wayne County, Ohio
 Huber Heights, Ohio, formerly Wayne Township

Pennsylvania
 Wayne Township, Armstrong County, Pennsylvania
 Wayne Township, Clinton County, Pennsylvania
 Wayne Township, Crawford County, Pennsylvania
 Wayne Township, Dauphin County, Pennsylvania
 Wayne Township, Erie County, Pennsylvania
 Wayne Township, Greene County, Pennsylvania
 Wayne Township, Lawrence County, Pennsylvania
 Wayne Township, Mifflin County, Pennsylvania
 Wayne Township, Schuylkill County, Pennsylvania

South Dakota
 Wayne Township, Hanson County, South Dakota, in Hanson County, South Dakota
 Wayne Township, Lake County, South Dakota, in Lake County, South Dakota
 Wayne Township, Minnehaha County, South Dakota, in Minnehaha County, South Dakota

Township name disambiguation pages